Juan José "J. J." López, (born October 31, 1950) is an Argentine football manager and former player, who played as a midfielder. López spent the most part of his career in River Plate, where he won 7 titles. With Argentinos Juniors, where he played in the 1980s, López won four titles, including one Copa Libertadores.

Playing career

Club
López started his playing career with River Plate in 1970. He became an important player at the club, winning seven league titles. He played 466 games and scored 84 goals. López is one of the most decorated players in the history of River Plate, and only three other players have played more games for the club (Amadeo Carrizo, Ángel Labruna and Reinaldo Merlo).

López left River Plate after the 1981 season to join Talleres de Córdoba, where he played during 1982. He was signed by River's rivals, Boca Juniors, in 1983, and played 38 games for the club with 6 goals scored.

In 1984, he joined Argentinos Juniors and helped them to secure their first ever Primera División title in the 1984 Metropolitano. The next season, Argentinos won their second championship, the 1985 Nacional; and followed it up with winning the Copa Libertadores. In 1986, López joined Belgrano, where he played until his retirement in 1987.

National team
During the 1970s, López played for the Argentina national football team.

Managerial career

After retiring as a player, López has worked as the manager of several clubs in Argentina. His first managerial position was with Racing de Córdoba. He then managed Instituto, Unión de Santa Fe, Rosario Central and Olimpo.

López has also had two spells as manager of Talleres de Córdoba. In his second spell with the club, he led them to a third-place finish in the 2004 Clausura, but the club were relegated after losing a relegation playoff against Argentinos Juniors. In 2005, he took over as the manager of Libertad in Paraguay.

Since 2010, López works as a youth manager in River Plate. He has also worked as caretaker manager twice, after the departures of Leonardo Astrada first and then Ángel Cappa. During his second period as caretaker, López obtained 13 over 18 points in the last six games of the 2010 Apertura, rounding a 4th-place finish. Therefore, at the end of the tournament he was confirmed as the team's manager for the following championship by club president Daniel Passarella.

Honours

Player
 River Plate
Primera División (7): 1975 Metropolitano, 1975 Nacional, 1977 Metropolitano, 1977 Nacional, 1979 Metropolitano, 1979 Nacional, 1980 Metropolitano

 Argentinos Juniors
Primera División (2): 1984 Metropolitano, 1985 Nacional
Copa Libertadores (1): 1985
Copa Interamericana (1): 1986

References

External links

 

1950 births
Living people
Sportspeople from Buenos Aires Province
Argentine footballers
Argentina international footballers
Association football midfielders
Club Atlético River Plate footballers
Talleres de Córdoba footballers
Boca Juniors footballers
Argentinos Juniors footballers
Club Atlético Belgrano footballers
Argentine Primera División players
Argentine football managers
Racing de Córdoba managers
Instituto managers
Unión de Santa Fe managers
Rosario Central managers
Talleres de Córdoba managers
Olimpo managers
Club Atlético River Plate managers